Carl Keiji Iwasaki (born October 30, 1961) is an American baseball coach and former catcher. He played college baseball at Northern Colorado for coach Tom Petroff from 1981 to 1984. He then served as the head of the Austin Kangaroos (2005–2010) and the Northern Colorado Bears (2011–2022)

Early life
Iwasaki graduated from Punahou School in 1980, then played four seasons at Northern Colorado from 1981 through 1984, graduating in 1985.

Coaching career
Iwasaki spent five years coaching the Bakersfield Braves select team and three years with Hawaii Winter Baseball. He then served as an assistant coach for two seasons with the Saddleback Gauchos junior college team in Mission Viejo, California. 

Next, he worked two seasons at Division III before being elevated to the top job for five seasons. He made the rare jump from Division III to newly Division I Northern Colorado in the summer of 2010.

In first three seasons with the Bears, he has led the team to a Great West Conference title and the championship game of the 2011 Great West Conference baseball tournament.  Iwasaki earned GWC Coach of the Year honors in 2013. The Bears joined the Western Athletic Conference for the 2014 season. Iwasaki retired from coaching following the 2022 season.

Head coaching record

References

External links
Northern Colorado bio

1961 births
Living people
Sportspeople from Honolulu
Baseball players from Honolulu
Baseball coaches from Hawaii
Punahou School alumni
Austin Kangaroos baseball coaches
Northern Colorado Bears baseball coaches
Northern Colorado Bears baseball players
Saddleback Gauchos baseball coaches